Liběchov is a town in Mělník District in the Central Bohemian Region of the Czech Republic. It has about 1,100 inhabitants.

Administrative parts
The village of Ješovice is an administrative part of Liběchov.

Etymology
The name is derived from the personal name Luběch or Liběch, meaning "Luběch's/Liběch's (court)".

Geography
It lies on the border between the Ralsko Uplands and Jizera Table. The municipality is situtated on the right bank of the Elbe River, at its confluence with the Liběchovka Stream.

History
The first written mention of Liběchov is from 1311. Among the most notable owners were the noble families of Pachta (18th century) and Veith (19th century).

Sights
The main landmark is the Liběchov Castle. It was originally a water fortress from ther 14th century, rebuilt into a Renaissance castle in the 16th century. In 1720–1730, the castle was baroque rebuilt by the architect František Maxmilián Kaňka and extended. After the fire in 1811, Neoclassical modifications were made. The castle was damaged during the 2002 European floods and has been inaccessible since then, but is surrounded by a freely accessible castle park.

The Church of Saint Gall was built in the Baroque style in 1738–1741.

North of the town is Klácelka, an artificial cave featuring large sculptures by Václav Levý.

References

External links

Cities and towns in the Czech Republic
Populated places in Mělník District